Szwarc is a Polonized-Yiddish version of the German surname Schwartz.

The surname may refer to:
  (born 1951), Polish historian, University of Warsaw professor 
 Arthur Szwarc (born 1995), Canadian volleyball player
 Bożena Szwarc, Polish model known as “Polish nurse” for Polish Tourism Organisation promotion (part of Polish plumber campaign)
 Dawid Szwarc, better known as Juliusz Hibner (1912–1994), brigadier general in the Polish People's Army and recipient of the title of Hero of Soviet Union
 Halina Szwarc (1923–2002), member of the Polish resistance during the Second World War
 Jan Szwarc (born 1946), Polish politician
 Jeannot Szwarc (born 1939), director of film and television
 Jerzy Szwarc, LOT Polish Airlines Flight 16 first officer
 Michael Szwarc (1909–2000), Polish-Jewish born British and American polymer chemist who discovered and studied ionic living polymerization
 Marek Szwarc (1892–1958), Polish-Jewish painter and sculptor 
 Sabina Szwarc (1923–2021), Polish-American ophthalmologist and memoirist
 Sacha Szwarc, film editor
 Samuel Schwarz, born Samuel Szwarc (1880–1953), Polish-Portuguese Jewish mining engineer, archaeologist, and historian
 Sandy Szwarc (born 1956), writer and marketing consultant 
 Tereska Torrès born Tereska Szwarc (1920–2012), Polish-Jewish born French writer, 

Polish-language surnames
de:Szwarc
fr:Szwarc
pl:Szwarc
Yiddish-language surnames